Vahedabad may refer to:
 Vahedabad, South Khorasan (وحداباد - Vaḩedābād)